Davik is a village in Bremanger Municipality in Vestland county, Norway. The village of Kjølsdalen lies across the fjord from Davik. The population of the village (in 2001) was about 330 residents.

The village of Davik was the administrative centre of the old municipality of Davik which was in existence from 1838 until 1964 when it was dissolved and its lands were split between three other municipalities.  Some of the municipal services were based in Davik village, while others were located in Bryggja which was a larger urban area.  Davik Church is located in Davik village.

Name
The village is named after the old Davik farm, since the first Davik Church was located there.  The first element means "spear" and the last element is identical with the word vik which means "inlet", so the name appears to be referring to the long, skinny spear-like shape of the local fjord.

References

Villages in Vestland
Bremanger